Il-Kappara is a hamlet in Malta, situated between San Ġwann, St. Julian's and Gżira. Kappara is mainly part of San Ġwann.

Buildings in Kappara 
 Antonio Bosio Secondary School
 Chiswick House School
 Ta' Ċieda Tower
 Ta' Xindi Farmhouse

Towns in Malta
San Ġwann